The 1947 Alcorn A&M Braves football team was an American football team that represented Alcorn A&M College as a member of the South Central Athletic Conference (SCAC) during the 1947 college football season. In their first season under head coach W. Felix Harris, Alcorn compiled a 10–1 record (7–0 against conference opponents), shut out eight of eleven opponents, and outscored all opponents by a total of 327 to 79. The team won the SCAC championship, and was also ranked No. 1 among the nation's smaller black college football teams by the Pittsburgh Courier using the Dickinson Rating System. The team played its home games in Alcorn, Mississippi.

Schedule

References

Alcorn
Alcorn State Braves football seasons
Alcorn A&M Braves football